Stokes is a surname, and may refer to:

A
Adrian Stokes (disambiguation)
Adrian Scott Stokes (1854–1935), English landscape painter
Alan and Alex Stokes (born 1996), American internet celebrities 
Alan Stokes (born 1981), British professional surfer and model
Alec Stokes (1919–2003), English scientist and contributor to discovery of DNA
Andy Stokes, American football player
Ann Bradford Stokes (1830-1903), African American nurse
Anson Phelps Stokes (disambiguation)
Anson Phelps Stokes (1838–1913), a merchant, banker, publicist, and multimillionaire
Anson Phelps Stokes, (1874–1958), an educator and clergyman
Anson Phelps Stokes, (1905–1986), a clergyman
Anthony Stokes, an Irish footballer
Antony Stokes (born 1965), British diplomat
Arthur Stokes (disambiguation)
Arthur Stokes (footballer), (1868–1960) English footballer

B
Barry Stokes (disambiguation)
Barry Stokes (born 1973), American football offensive lineman
Barry Stokes, British actor
Ben Stokes (born 1991), English cricketer
Bobby Stokes (1951–1995), English footballer
Brian Stokes (born 1979), American baseball pitcher

C
Cameron Stokes, Australian footballer
Carl B. Stokes (1927–1996), mayor of Cleveland, Ohio and first African American mayor of a major U.S. city
Charles Stokes (disambiguation)
Charles Stokes (trader) (1852–1895), Irish missionary turned trader who lived much of his life in Africa
Chris Stokes (disambiguation)
Chris Stokes (record producer), American record producer
Colin Stokes (born 1987), American cellist
Corey Stokes, American basketball player

D
David Stokes (disambiguation)
David Stokes (soccer) (born 1982), American soccer player
David Stokes (English footballer), English footballer
David Stokes (Guatemalan footballer) (born 1946), Guatemalan footballer
Demi Stokes (born 1991), association footballer
Dennis Stokes (1911–1998), English cricketer
Derek Stokes, British footballer
Donald Stokes (disambiguation)
Doris Stokes (1920–1987), British spiritualist
Doug Stokes, British academic

E
Ed Stokes, American basketball player
Edith Minturn Stokes (1867–1937), American philanthropist, artistic muse and socialite during the Gilded Age.
Edward Stokes (disambiguation)
Edward C. Stokes (1860–1942), the 32nd governor of New Jersey
Edward L. Stokes (1880–1964), US Congressman from Pennsylvania
Elizabeth Joan Stokes (1912–2010), English bacteriologist
Eric Stokes (disambiguation), multiple people
Evelyn Stokes, New Zealand geographer

F
 Francis Stokes
Francis Marion Stokes (1883–1975), American architect
Francis William Stokes (1832–1889), pastoralist and politician in South Australia
Frank Stokes (disambiguation)
Frank Stokes (1888–1955), American blues musician
Frank Wilbert Stokes (1858–1955), American artist
Fred Stokes, American football player
Frederick Stokes (disambiguation)
Frederick Wilfrid Scott Stokes (1860–1927), inventor of the Stokes Mortar

G
George Stokes (disambiguation)
George Gabriel Stokes (1819–1903), Irish mathematician and physicist
George Thomas Stokes (1843–1898), Irish ecclesiastical historian
Gerard Stokes (1955–2020), New Zealand rugby league footballer
Graham Stokes (disambiguation)
Greg Stokes (born 1963), American basketball player

H
Henry Stokes (1841–1926), Irish civil servant
Henry Scott Stokes (born 1938), British journalist
Henry Sewell Stokes (1808–1895), British poet
Henry William Stokes (1871–1966), American farmer and politician

I
Isaac Newton Phelps Stokes (1867–1944), American architect

J
J. J. Stokes, American football player
J. William Stokes (James William Stokes, 1853–1901), U.S. Representative from South Carolina
Jack Stokes (disambiguation)
Jack Stokes (1923–2000), Canadian politician
James Stokes
James Stokes (1915–1945), Scottish soldier
James Boulter Stokes, son-in-law of Anson Greene Phelps
James Graham Phelps Stokes, American millionaire socialist
Jason Stokes, American baseball player
Jervis Stokes (born 1927), Australian rules footballer
John Stokes (disambiguation)
John Stokes, mayor of Bristol in 1364, 1366, and 1379
John Stokes, Vice-Chancellor of the University of Cambridge 1565–1566
John Fisher Stokes (1912–2010), English physician
John S. Stokes (1871–1923), Chief Master-at-Arms in the United States Navy and recipient of the Medal of Honor in the Philippine–American War
John William Stokes (1910 – c. 1995), Australian administrator
John Stokes (1915–1990), Principal of Queen's College, Hong Kong, buried in Wolvercote Cemetery
John Heydon Stokes (1917–2003), British Conservative MP 1970–1992
Jonathan Stokes (c. 1755 – 1831), English physician and botanist
John Edward "Jack" Stokes (1923–2000), Canadian politician, Speaker of the Legislative Assembly of Ontario
John Stokes (born 1940), Irish musician
John Stokes, a British comics artist best known for Fishboy
Juanita Stokes, American rapper
Julie Stokes (born 1970), Louisiana politician

K
Keith Stokes, American football player
Kerry Stokes, Australian businessman

L
Leslie Stokes, BBC radio producer and director
Loren Stokes, American basketball player
Lori Stokes, American television journalist
Louis Stokes, American politician

M
Mack B. Stokes, American retired bishop
Margaret Stokes, Irish antiquarian, artist and author
Marianne Stokes, born Marianne Preindlsberger (1855–1927), Austrian painter
Marion Stokes (1929–2012), American archivist, news producer and civil rights activist
Martin Stokes, British academic
Mathew Stokes, Australian footballer
Maura Stokes, American statistician and novelist
Maurice Stokes (1933–1970), American basketball player
Missouri H. Stokes (1838-1910), American social reformer, writer
Michael Stokes (disambiguation), multiple people
Mitchell Stokes, English cricketer
Montfort Stokes (1762–1842), American senator and governor of North Carolina

N
Niall Stokes, Irish editor of the Hot Press magazine
Nick Stokes, fictional character in the CSI: Crime Scene Investigation TV series

O
Olivia Stokes (disambiguation)

P
Patrick Stokes (disambiguation), multiple people
Pringle Stokes, British Navy officer who commanded

R
Richard Stokes (disambiguation)
Ricky Stokes, American men's college basketball coach
Robert Stokes (disambiguation)
Rose Pastor Stokes (1879–1933), Russian-born American Socialist Party leader and feminist
Rufus Stokes (1922–1986), American inventor
Ruth Stokes (1890–1968), American mathematician

S
Satyananda Stokes (1882–1946), American-born Indian activist
Sewell Stokes (1902–1979), English writer 
Stan Stokes, American painter
Steph Stokes, fictional character on the TV show Emmerdale
Suzanne Stokes, American glamour model and actress

T
Thomas Lunsford Stokes (1898–1958), American journalist
Tim Stokes, American football player
Tobin Stokes, Canadian composer
Tony Stokes, English footballer
Trey Stokes, American filmmaker and puppeteer

W
Walter Stokes (1898–1996), American sport shooter
Walter W. Stokes (1880–1960), New York state senator
Whitley Stokes (1830–1909), Irish lawyer and Celtic scholar
William Stokes (disambiguation), several people
William Brickly Stokes (1814–1897), American Civil War soldier and politician
Willie Stokes (disambiguation), several people
Winford Stokes (1951–1990), American serial killer

V
Vidya Stokes, Indian politician

Y
Yvonne Stokes, Australian mathematician

See also
 Governor Stokes (disambiguation)
 Senator Stokes (disambiguation)
 Stokes (disambiguation)

References

English-language surnames